Murlidhar Kisan Mohol is an Indian politician. He was elected Mayor of Pune in November 2019 replacing Mukta Tilak. Mohol is corporator from 12 C ward of Pune Municipal Corporation in 2017 elections as a member of Bharatiya Janata Party.

External links 
 Murlidhar Mohol on Twitter

References 

1974 births
Living people
Bharatiya Janata Party politicians from Maharashtra
People from Pune
Mayors of Pune